In Greek mythology, Oenone (Ancient Greek: Οἰνώνη Oinōnē; "wine woman") was the first wife of Paris of Troy, whom he abandoned for Helen. Oenone was also the ancient name of an island, which was later named after Aegina, daughter of the river god Asopus.

Biography 
Oenone was a mountain nymph (an oread) on Mount Ida in Phrygia, a mountain associated with the Mother Goddess Cybele and the Titaness Rhea. Her gift of prophecy was learned from Rhea. Her father was either the river-gods, Cebren or Oeneus. Her name links her to the gift of wine.

Mythology 

Paris, son of the king Priam and the queen Hecuba, fell in love with Oenone when he was a shepherd on the slopes of Mount Ida, having been exposed in infancy (owing to a prophecy that he would be the means of the destruction of the city of Troy) and rescued by the herdsman Agelaus. The couple married, and Oenone gave birth to a son, Corythus.

When Paris later abandoned her to return to Troy and sail across the Aegean to kidnap Helen, the queen of Sparta, Oenone predicted the Trojan War. Out of revenge for Paris's betrayal, she sent Corythus to guide the Greeks to Troy. Another version has it that she used her son to drive a rift between Paris and Helen, but Paris, not recognizing his own son, killed him.

The only extensive surviving narration of Oenone and Paris is Quintus Smyrnaeus, Posthomerica, Book X, ll. 259-489, which tells the return of the dying Paris to Oenone. Mortally wounded by Philoctetes's arrow, he begged Oenone to heal him with her herbal arts, but she refused and cast him out with scorn, to return to Helen's bed, and Paris died on the lower slopes of Ida. Then, overcome with remorse, Oenone, the one whole-hearted mourner of Paris, threw herself onto his burning funeral pyre, which the shepherds had raised. A fragment of Bacchylides suggests that she threw herself off a cliff, in the Bibliotheke it is noted "when she found him dead she hanged herself", and Lycophron imagines her hurtling head first from the towering walls of Troy. Her tragic story makes one of the Love Romances of Parthenius of Nicaea.

Ovid includes an imagined reproachful letter from Oenone to Paris in his Heroides, a text that has been extended by a number of spurious post-Ovidian interpolations, which include an elsewhere unattested rape of Oenone by Apollo.

In literature 
Thomas Heywood wrote the epyllion Oenone and Paris (1594) in rhyme royal.

William Morris included "The Death of Paris" in The Earthly Paradise.

Lawrence Binyon published Paris and Oenone, a one-act closet tragedy in blank verse, in 1906.

Tennyson adapted the source material of Smyrnaeus for "The Death of Oenone" (1892), distilling its tragic essence. This was Tennyson's second poem on the subject; his previous attempt, "Oenone", was critically panned when first published in 1833.  The poem was practically rewritten between then and 1842 and the revised version has been described as exquisitely beautiful.

In Racine's Phèdre, the name Oenone is given to Phaedra's nurse, a character who also commits suicide.

Notes

References 
 Apollodorus, The Library with an English Translation by Sir James George Frazer, F.B.A., F.R.S. in 2 Volumes, Cambridge, MA, Harvard University Press; London, William Heinemann Ltd. 1921. ISBN 0-674-99135-4. Online version at the Perseus Digital Library. Greek text available from the same website.
 Graves, Robert, The Greek Myths, Harmondsworth, London, England, Penguin Books, 1960. 
 Graves, Robert, The Greek Myths: The Complete and Definitive Edition. Penguin Books Limited. 2017. 
 Parthenius, Love Romances translated by Sir Stephen Gaselee (1882-1943), S. Loeb Classical Library Volume 69. Cambridge, MA. Harvard University Press. 1916.  Online version at the Topos Text Project.
 Parthenius, Erotici Scriptores Graeci, Vol. 1. Rudolf Hercher. in aedibus B. G. Teubneri. Leipzig. 1858. Greek text available at the Perseus Digital Library.

External links 

 OENONE from The Theoi Project

Oreads
Nymphs
Children of Potamoi
Women of Apollo
Mythological rape victims
Women of the Trojan war
Anatolian characters in Greek mythology